Quintus Claudius Quadrigarius was a Roman historian.

Work
Quadrigarius's annals spanned at least 23 books. They began with the conquest of Rome by the Gauls (BC), reached Cannae by Book 5, and ended with the age of Sulla,  or 82BC. 

The surviving fragments of his work were collected by Hermann Peter. The largest fragment is preserved in Aulus Gellius, and concerns a single combat between T. Manlius Torquatus and a Gaul.

Legacy
Quadrigarius's work was considered very important, especially for the contemporary history he narrates. From its sixth book onward, Livy's History of Rome used Quadrigarius and Valerius Antias as major sources, (if not uncritically).  He is cited by Aulus Gellius, and he was probably the "Clodius" mentioned in Plutarch's Life of Numa. 

The judgment of his prose has varied. Some considered that it was his lively style which ensured his survival in various extracts; but more perhaps would agree with Fronto that his language was pure and colloquial (“puri ac prope cotidiani sermonis”), and that it benefited from its straightforwardness, and absence of archaisms.

See also
Lucius Coelius Antipater

References

Citations

Bibliography
 W. Kierdorf in Brill's New Pauly s.v. Claudius [I 30]
 A. Klotz, "Der Annalist Q. Claudius Quadrigarius." Rheinische Museum 91 (1942) 268–285.
 E. Badian, "The Early Historians" in T. Dorey (ed.) Latin Historians (1966) 1-38.
 

Latin historians
Quadrigarius, Quintus
Old Latin-language writers
1st-century BC Romans
1st-century BC historians